Stéphanie Foretz Gacon and Alexa Glatch were the defending champions, but both players chose not to participate.

Lindsay Lee-Waters and Megan Moulton-Levy won the title, defeating Alexandra Panova and Lesia Tsurenko in the final, 2–6, 6–4, [10–7].

Seeds

Draw

Draw

References
 Main Draw

The Oaks Club Challenger - Doubles